Erode West or 'Erode (West)' is a state assembly constituency of Erode City in Erode District in the state of Tamil Nadu, India. Its State Assembly Constituency number is 99. It consists of portions of the Perundurai and Erode taluks. It is included in Erode Parliamentary Constituency. It is one of the 234 State Legislative Assembly Constituencies in Tamil Nadu.

This constituency was newly formed, in the year of 2008, by dividing the integrated Erode Assembly Constituency. Erode West was one of 17 assembly constituencies to have VVPAT facility with EVMs in 2016 Tamil Nadu Legislative Assembly election.

Boundaries
It covers the western part of Erode City Corporation to the Perundurai constituency limit on the west and Modakurichi Constituency limit on the south; a part of the city is also covered by these two constituencies. Also Bhavani constituency covers some part of the city in the north.

Demographics
The constituency has a significant number of Kongu Vellalar Gounder and Senguntha Mudaliar,vettuva gounder, Nadar and Adi Dravida communities.

Members of assembly
Elected members from this constituency are as follows,

Election results

2021

2016

2011

References 

 

Assembly constituencies of Tamil Nadu
Erode